The 2006–07 season saw Falkirk compete in the Scottish Premier League where they finished in 7th position with 50 points.

Final league table

Results
Falkirk's score comes first

Legend

Scottish Premier League

Scottish Cup

Scottish League Cup

References

External links
 Falkirk 2006–07 at Soccerbase.com (select relevant season from dropdown list)

Falkirk F.C. seasons
Falkirk